The 2011 Louisiana Attorney General election took place on October 22, 2011, to elect the Attorney General of Louisiana, with a runoff election held on November 19, 2011. Buddy Caldwell, a former Democrat who joined the Republican Party in February 2011, won re-election.

Republican candidates

Declared

 Buddy Caldwell, incumbent

Withdrew

 Joseph Cao, former U.S. Representative

References

Attorney General
Louisiana

Louisiana Attorney General elections